C. Crawford Hollidge was a women's clothing store of Boston in the 20th century.

The business was started by Clarence Crawford Hollidge in 1909, as a dry goods store in Milton, Massachusetts just south of Boston. By 1930 he had transformed the store into a high-end women’s apparel and accessories store.

At its height, C. Crawford Hollidge had four locations in wealthy towns in eastern Massachusetts: Boston, Wellesley, Cohasset on the South Shore, and Hyannis, a Cape Cod resort town.

The flagship downtown Boston store was located at 141 Tremont Street at Temple Place, directly across Temple Place from rival R. H. Stearns.   The architects were Fehmer & Page.  On February 18, 1967 the building was engulfed by a five alarm fire. It was a total loss and had to be demolished. Crawford Hollidge reopened on Boylston Street, but closed within a few years, and its branch stores also eventually closed.

In literature

References

1920 establishments in Massachusetts
Defunct clothing retailers of the United States
Defunct department stores based in Massachusetts